Ray Cokes (born Raymond Christopher Cokes on 24 February 1958) is an English television presenter.

Career

Early life
Ray's father was an officer in the Royal Navy, who was stationed at various navy bases around the world. When Ray was 15, the family permanently resettled back to Britain. At age 20, Ray moved to Belgium, where he took on various jobs, including DJ on a local radio station. This led to a job as a music presenter on Belgian national TV channel RTBF, where he presented the show Rox Box in 1982. With growing reputation, more music video shows followed on Sky Channel and Music Box.

When MTV Europe launched in 1987 he became a video jockey mainly co-presenting alongside Marcel Vanthilt.

MTV's Most Wanted
Between 1992 and 1995, Cokes hosted MTV Europe's live television series MTV's Most Wanted, an award-winning daily show which soon became the most popular on channel with its zoo TV format. The studio crew were as big as the celebrities who appeared on the show, including Rob & Andy the cameramen, Floor manager Nina and pathetic Pat. Each night (Tuesday to Friday) musical stars performed live as well as competitions and on-air phone calls to viewers. The team wanted to end the show at its peak, with the last six months with Will MacDonald as producer, who was associated with Ginger Chris Evans on many of his TV projects. The last musical act were The Cure who let Cokes play with them on their final song. Other guests that night included Bjork and Bono from U2.

After a 2 month sabbatical, MTV decided to spend money on a big once-a-week spectacular called X Ray Vision. Instead of coming from the studio, it used the 1st floor of the MTV building at Camden Lock.

After several weeks the show went on location to Hamburg. It was billed to feature punk band Die Toten Hosen playing live on screen. A local journalist, however, wrote that the band would be there in person. A large number of their fans turned up and were disappointed to discover their absence. They vented their anger by throwing glass bottles and beer at a confused Cokes and camera crew, who were unaware of what had been written in the press. For the safety of his crew, Cokes decided to end the show early. MTV used him as a scapegoat and a week later the show went out for a final time, bringing Cokes' time at MTV to an end, after nine years.

Not long after, MTV Europe broke up into localized versions, and in 1994, Cokes released a single titled "Simply Sexy!" under the name Ray Cokes & the Sex Gods featuring Al Agami, the song's title referring to one of the catchphrases frequently used in Most Wanted.

After MTV

While working with Will MacDonald on MTV's Most Wanted Cokes met Chris Evans, who brought him to the original Virgin 1215 in the UK. The show went out weekday evenings in a similar time slot to his old TV show.

Cokes also presented series 2 of Channel Four's hit 90s TV show Wanted.

His subsequent work includes presenting En Direct de from 2005 to 2009, broadcast on the French television station France 4.

Cokes also worked as the compère for the White Concert, a live concert recorded in Horsens, Denmark, in November 2008 due to the 40-year jubilee of the Beatles' eponymous White Album.

In late 2008 he moved to Berlin and in 2009 to Antwerp, Belgium, declaring that he would like to permanently settle there.

During the summer of 2009, Cokes and Jean Blaute co-hosted Tournée Générale, a 10-part exploration of Belgian beer around the world from Sputnik Media, on Flemish channel Canvas. A second 10-part series was aired in 2011 and a third in 2013 on the Belgian channel Eén.

In September 2011, Cokes hosted the Sunday afternoon show Cokes calling on Classic 21, one of the radio stations of the Belgian RTBF.

From 2012 to 2014, he was one of the three judges in the first Belgium's Got Talent.

In February 2014, he hosted the Swedish Grammy awards.

In October 2014, he released his autobiography, My Most Wanted Life - On-Screen, Off-Screen and In-Between, available in German and English editions.

Cokes has been put into Minecraft as a splash text reading: "Bring me Ray Cokes" because Notch, the game's developer, used to watch Cokes when he was a kid.

During the COVID-19 pandemic, Cokes whilst living in Spain hosted an Instagram live show several nights a week.

References

External links

Official website

tourneegenerale.canvas.be
standaard.be

1958 births
Living people
British VJs (media personalities)
English television presenters